Jiří Sekyra (21 April 1929 in Prague – 18 October 1977 in Prague) was a Czech ice hockey player who competed in the 1952 Winter Olympics.

References

External links
 

1929 births
1977 deaths
Czech ice hockey forwards
Olympic ice hockey players of Czechoslovakia
Ice hockey players at the 1952 Winter Olympics
Ice hockey people from Prague
Czechoslovak ice hockey forwards